"In My Feelings" is a song by Canadian rapper Drake from his fifth studio album Scorpion (2018). It was released to rhythmic and contemporary hit radio on July 10, 2018, as the album's fifth single. The song features additional vocals by the City Girls, though they are uncredited on the official version. The song topped the Billboard Hot 100 chart for ten weeks and broke several records.

Composition and samples

"In My Feelings" is a bounce track. Upon its release, several outlets reported that the song and "Kiki" was about Keshia Chanté, Drake's first girlfriend and childhood friend from Toronto. It was also reported that "KB" was K'yanna Barber, a resident of Oakland, California. Drake also makes references to Jennifer Lopez ("Jenny"), whom he briefly dated in 2016, and Quality Control duo City Girls, made up of members Yung Miami ("Resha") and JT. The City Girls also provide uncredited vocals.

The track samples "Smoking Gun (Acapella Version)" by Magnolia Shorty for the breakdown. "Lollipop" by Lil Wayne is also sampled and the track ends with audio from the episode "Champagne Papi" from the television series Atlanta. The song was later slightly altered and re-uploaded to streaming sites with additional sampled vocals from Lil Wayne.

Release and reception
The song inspired an Internet meme dance challenge known as the "Kiki Challenge", "In My Feelings Challenge" or "DoTheShiggy", the latter being a reference to the comedian Shiggy, who posted a video on his Instagram account of him dancing to the song; this video was credited for inspiring the challenge. The dance challenge is to walk outside of moving vehicles (ghost riding) and dance in oncoming traffic. Originating in the US, the challenge later spread to other parts of the world where in some countries it caused controversy and public concern. The challenge is subject to fines on public roads in the Philippines.

The Fader deemed the bounce track as the highlight of the double album, with writer Ben Dandrige-Lemco saying, "it takes a whole 20 songs to get to the best part of the album, 'In My Feelings'". The Hollywood Reporters Jonny Coleman felt that the song, along with "Nice for What", "might be two of the most enduring tracks [in the album]". Andy Hutchins of Time called the song "a disastrous misunderstanding of New Orleans bounce."

Billboard named "In My Feelings" the 42nd-best song of 2018.

Commercial performance
In the Billboard magazine issue dated July 14, 2018, "In My Feelings" debuted at number six on the Billboard Hot 100, one of seven top 10 entries by Drake that week. The following week, partly due to the rising popularity of the dance challenge associated with the song, it ascended to the top spot of the chart, becoming Drake's sixth number-one single on the chart. On the issue dated July 28, 2018, "In My Feelings" broke the streaming record for the most streams in a single week with 116.2 million streams (later being broken by "Old Town Road" by Lil Nas X & Billy Ray Cyrus on the week of April 13, 2019, which has the current record of 143 million streams) and retained the top spot on the chart. It remained on top for ten consecutive weeks until it was unseated by "Girls Like You" by Maroon 5 featuring Cardi B. It ultimately remained in the top ten for 14 weeks. It also reached number one on the Canadian Hot 100 and the UK Singles Chart.

In the UK, it did not enter the charts on the first week due to chart rules, but the next week, due to the popularity of the dance challenge, it entered at number four. A week later, it rose to number one, becoming Drake's fifth number one in the UK and his third consecutive number one in 2018. "In My Feelings" spent four weeks at the top of the chart, before being replaced by "Shotgun".

The success of "In My Feelings" made Drake the record holder for most number one hits among rappers in the history of the Hot 100 chart.

Music video
The song's music video was shot on July 23, 2018, in New Orleans and was directed by Karena Evans, whom Drake previously worked with on the videos for "God's Plan", "Nice for What", and "I'm Upset" earlier in the year.

The song's music video was released on August 2, 2018, on Drake's YouTube channel. "KeKe" is played by La La Anthony while her mother is played by Phylicia Rashad. The video takes place in New Orleans and shows people dancing to the song, including Yung Miami of the City Girls and bounce music legend Big Freedia.  Comedian Shiggy, who has been credited with inventing the viral "In My Feelings Challenge", makes a cameo as a production assistant as well as a dancer in the video. At the end of the music video, a small montage of celebrities and internet influencers participating in the "In My Feelings Challenge" is displayed. A few of these people include Will Smith, DJ Khaled, J-Hope (BTS), Steve Aoki, Odell Beckham Jr., Dua Lipa, Millie Bobby Brown, Liza Koshy, Noah Schnapp, Ryan Seacrest, Shay Mitchell, Bobby Berk, Tan France, Karamo Brown, Antoni Porowski, Jonathan Van Ness, Sonya DeVille and Ciara.

As of May 2021, the music video on YouTube has amassed more than 263 million views.

Awards and nominations

Usage in media 
"In My Feelings" is featured in the heavily panned YouTube Rewind 2018: Everyone Controls Rewind.

Personnel
Credits adapted from the album's liner notes and Tidal.
 Noah "40" Shebib – production, recording
 Noel "Gadget" Campbell – mixing
 Harley Arsenault – mixing assistance, recording assistance
 Greg Moffet – mixing assistance, recording assistance 
 Ronald Moonoo – mixing assistance
 Blaqnmild – production
 TrapMoneyBenny – production

Charts

Weekly charts

Monthly charts

Year-end charts

Decade-end charts

Certifications

Release history

See also

 List of number-one singles of 2018 (Australia)
 List of number-one digital tracks of 2018 (Australia)
 List of number-one urban singles of 2018 (Australia)
 List of Canadian Hot 100 number-one singles of 2018
 List of number-one digital songs of 2018 (Canada)
 List of number-one hits of 2018 (Denmark)
 List of number-one songs of 2018 (Lebanon)
 List of number-one songs of 2018 (Malaysia)
 List of Dutch Top 40 number-one singles of 2018
 List of number-one singles from the 2010s (New Zealand)
 List of number-one singles of 2018 (Portugal)
 List of number-one songs of 2018 (Singapore)
 List of number-one singles of the 2010s (Sweden)
 List of UK Singles Chart number ones of the 2010s
 List of UK R&B Singles Chart number ones of 2018
 List of Billboard Hot 100 number-one singles of 2018
 List of Billboard Rhythmic number-one songs of the 2010s
 List of number-one Billboard Streaming Songs of 2018
 List of number-one digital songs of 2018 (U.S.)
 List of number-one R&B/hip-hop songs of 2018 (U.S.)

References

2018 controversies
2018 singles
2018 songs
Billboard Hot 100 number-one singles
Canadian Hot 100 number-one singles
Challenges
Drake (musician) songs
Dutch Top 40 number-one singles
Internet memes introduced in 2018
Music controversies
Number-one singles in Australia
Number-one singles in Denmark
Number-one singles in Greece
Number-one singles in Malaysia
Number-one singles in Portugal
Number-one singles in Singapore
Number-one singles in Sweden
Songs written by 40 (record producer)
Songs written by Drake (musician)
Songs written by Jim Jonsin
Songs written by Lil Wayne
Songs written by Static Major
UK Singles Chart number-one singles